Kuymak is a regional meal of Turkey. Its primary ingredients are corn meal and cheese and it is  typically served with bread and a spoon.  It is also popular in Georgia, Azerbaijan and some regions of Caucasus. In Azerbaijani language it is called Quymaq. In Iran it is referred to as Kāchi (Persian: کاچی).

Similar dishes
Muhlama, also referred to as "mıhlama", is a similar dish.

The Pontic Greeks, who originate from the Black Sea region, make a dish similar to kuymak; theirs is called  (pnt). , like kuymak, is made with butter, cornmeal, cheese, water or milk, and salt. It might also include yogurt, honey, or bacon. Cooked cornmeal sometimes goes by the same name.

See also
 Turkish cuisine
 List of maize dishes

References

External links
Video of  preparation
https://www.youtube.com/shorts/i3p0__W0wLA

Cheese dishes
Maize dishes
Turkish cuisine
Cuisine of Georgia (country)
Azerbaijani cuisine
Laz cuisine
Pontic Greek cuisine